Hossein Taheri (1941 – 17 August 2010) was the governor of East Azerbaijan Province from 1990 to 1995. He also served as the Vice Minister of Interior from 1987 to 1989.

Governors of East Azerbaijan Province
Iranian Vice Ministers
Accademia Nazionale di Arte Drammatica Silvio D'Amico alumni
Governors of West Azerbaijan Province
Governors of Tehran Province
1941 births
2010 deaths